Patwin (Patween) is a critically endangered Wintuan language of Northern California. As of 2021, there was one documented first language speaker of Patwin. As of 2010, Patwin language classes were taught at the Yocha Dehe Wintun Nation (formerly Rumsey Rancheria) tribal school (Dubin 2010).

Patwin has two (excl. Southern Patwin) or three (incl. Southern Patwin) dialects: "River Patwin (or Valley Patwin) was traditionally spoken along the Sacramento River in Colusa County ... Hill Patwin, was spoken in the plains and foothills to the west."

Southern Patwin became extinct shortly after contact. It is very poorly attested, and may be a separate Southern Wintuan language (Mithun 1999).

As of 2012, the Tewe Kewe Cultural Center of the Yocha Dehe Wintun Nation has "a California Indian Library Collection and an extensive Patwin language and history research section."

Phonemes

Consonants

Patwin has 25 consonant phonemes.  In the table below, the IPA form(s) of each consonant are given.  This is followed by the form commonly used in Lawyer (2021)'s grammar, if this is different from the IPA form.

 /ʔ/ is a marginal phoneme, occurring exclusively at morpheme boundaries.  Its distribution is not entirely predictable, however.
 Glottalized and aspirated consonants occur only syllable-initially.
 Some or all of the "alveolar" consonants (both central and lateral) would be more accurately described as being retracted alveolar consonants.

Vowels

Patwin has 10 vowels:

 Patwin vowels have a simple length distinction (short vs. long).
 All vowels are voiced and oral.

References

Further reading
Dubin, Margaret. "'Pass me that squirrel, toss me my iPod': Language learning at the Yocha Dehe Wintun Nation." News From Native California 23 (3), 2010.
 Lawyer, Lewis. 2015. "Patwin Phonemics, Phonetics, and Phonotactics". International Journal of American Linguistics. 81 (2). 221—260
 Lawyer, Lewis. 2015. "A Description of the Patwin Language". Ph.D. dissertation, University of California, Davis.
 Lawyer, Lewis. A Grammar of Patwin. Bloomington: University of Nebraska Press, 2021.
Mithun, Marianne, ed. The Languages of Native North America. Cambridge: Cambridge University Press, 1999.

External links
Overview at the Survey of California and Other Indian Languages
California Language Archive: Patwin
World Atlas of Language Structures: Patwin
CILC Patwin ethnographic and linguistic bibliography
Patwin language bibliography
Map showing Patwin dialect groups
OLAC Patwin resources, on Wintu page

Patwin
Wintuan languages
Indigenous languages of California
Endangered indigenous languages of the Americas
Native American language revitalization